Ghodadongari tehsil is a fourth-order administrative and revenue division, a subdivision of third-order administrative and revenue division of Betul district of Madhya Pradesh.

Geography
Ghodadongari tehsil has an area of 758.49 sq kilometers. It is bounded by Shahpur tehsil in the west and northwest, Hoshangabad district in the north, Chhindwara district in the northeast and east, Amla tehsil in the southeast, Betul tehsil in the south and Chicholi tehsil in the southwest.

See also 
Betul district

References 

Tehsils of Madhya Pradesh
Betul district